American Christian musician Cody Carnes has released two studio albums, one live album, two extended plays, and twenty-nine singles (including seven promotional singles).

Studio albums

Live albums

EPs

Singles

As lead artist

As featured artist

Promotional singles

As lead artist

As featured artist

Other charted songs

Other appearances

Notes

References

External links 
  on AllMusic

Christian music discographies
Discographies of American artists